Jorge Daniel Cardaccio (born 14 February 1959 in Montevideo) is a retired Uruguayan footballer who played as a midfielder and won the Copa Libertadores with Club Nacional de Football in 1988.

Playing career
Cardaccio was noted for his ability in marking and heading, as well as his fighting spirit. He played for clubs in four countries during his career, and won a number of national and intercontinental competitions while playing for his final club, Club Nacional de Football. Cardaccio retired in 1993.

Honours
 Grêmio Foot-Ball Porto Alegrense
Campeonato Gaúcho: 1979
 Club Nacional de Football
Uruguayan Primera División: 1992
Copa Libertadores: 1988
Recopa Sudamericana: 1988 (contested in 1989)
Copa Interamericana: 1988 (contested in 1989)
Intercontinental Cup: 1988
Torneos de Verano tournament marking 70 years of El Gráfico 1989
Supercopa Sudamericana: runners-up 1990

References

Grêmio Foot-Ball Porto Alegrense players
Club Nacional de Football players
Central Español players
Centro Atlético Fénix players
Deportivo Toluca F.C. players
Living people
1959 births
Sud América players
Association football midfielders
Uruguayan footballers